IEM can refer to:

 I.E.M. (album)
 Inborn error of metabolism
 In-ear monitors, devices used by musicians, audio engineers and audiophiles to listen to music 
 Incredible Expanding Mindfuck  (Music)
 Information Engineering Methodology
 Innovative Emergency Management
 Institute of Electronic Music and Acoustics (Institut für Elektronische Musik und Akustik), part of the University of Music and Performing Arts, Graz
 Institute of Engineering and Management
 Integrated Enterprise Modeling
 Institute of Engineering in Medicine, part of the University of California, San Diego 
 Institute for Experimental Mathematics, a central scientific facility of the University of Duisburg-Essen
 Intel Extreme Masters, a series of international esports tournaments 
 International emergency medicine
 Internet Explorer Mobile
 Ion evaporation model, a model explaining electrospray ionization in mass spectrometry
 Iowa Electronic Markets
 Internal Energy Market, of the European Union

See also

 
 
 lem (disambiguation)
 1Em